Anthony Tu Shihua (November 22, 1919 – January 4, 2017) was a bishop of the Chinese Patriotic Catholic Association.

Biography 
Ordained to the Roman Catholic priesthood in 1944, Tu Shihua was ordained a Roman Catholic bishop without papal mandate in 1959 for the Chinese Patriotic Catholic Association and served as the illegitimate bishop of the Roman Catholic Diocese of Hanyang.

A few months before his death, Bishop Shihua asked to be readmitted into full communion with the Pope, who welcomed him with the title of Bishop Emeritus of Puli. 

Shihua died in Beijing, China on January 4, 2017, aged 98.

Notes

21st-century Roman Catholic bishops in China
1919 births
2017 deaths
20th-century Roman Catholic bishops in China
Bishops of the Catholic Patriotic Association